Hiệp Lực is a commune (xã) and village in Ngân Sơn District, Bắc Kạn Province, in Vietnam.

The commune was formed by the consolidation the two former communes of Lãng Ngâm and Hương Nê.

Populated places in Bắc Kạn province
Communes of Bắc Kạn province